Bhavani (or Bhavanie) was a ship launched at Calcutta in 1797. On 6 December 1799, Lloyds List reported that "The Bhavanie, Carse, from Bengal to London, is lost near Boulogne." The War of the Second Coalition was raging at the time, and the French took her officers and crew prisoner.

Bhavani was part of a convoy under the escort of the Royal Navy frigate  at the time she was wrecked. French forts had initially fired on Bhavani but ceased when it became clear that she was a merchantman in distress. Twenty-four of her crew died, most of whom were Europeans; the rest were lascars. The French were solicitous of the survivors and took them to Valenciennes. The survivors left France on 10 January 1800 and arrived at London in the night of 12 January 1800.

Citations and references
Citations

References
 
 

1797 ships
British ships built in India
Age of Sail merchant ships
Merchant ships of the United Kingdom
Maritime incidents in 1799
Shipwrecks in the Bay of Biscay